Gianroberto Casaleggio (14 August 1954 – 12 April 2016) was an Italian entrepreneur and political activist, born in Milan.

He was co-founder and chairman of Casaleggio Associati srl, an internet and publishing company that advises on network strategies. He was editor of Beppe Grillo's blog, and together they founded the Five Star Movement, of which Casaleggio was sometimes called the "guru". In the Italian context, Casaleggio promoted the Web as a medium for political communication.

Biography
Casaleggio began his career working at Olivetti, then, in the late 1990s, became CEO at Webegg, an internet consulting company. Webegg suffered heavy losses (over €20 million) in the period 2002–2003, and Casaleggio was replaced as CEO in 2003 by Giuseppe Longo. In 2004, Casaleggio founded Casaleggio Associati, an internet consulting company that carries out research on e-commerce in Italy and whose findings are presented at a conference held in Milan every spring (since 2006).

Casaleggio Associati became the editor of Beppe Grillo's blog in 2005, as well as of some of Grillo's books. Casaleggio Associati was also editor of the web-blog of Antonio Di Pietro until 2010, and the website of Chiarelettere, an editor, until 2013, when he was dismissed following disagreement over the editorial strategy.

Casaleggio died on 12 April 2016 in Milan, at the age of 61, after a long period of illness.

Family
After Gianroberto's death, his son Davide was appointed to replace him as president of Casaleggio Associati.

References

Sources
  Five Star Movement
  Personal website
 
 

1954 births
2016 deaths
Businesspeople from Milan
Politicians from Milan
Five Star Movement politicians
Deaths from brain cancer in Italy